The 2014–15 season will be Paksi SE's 9th competitive season, 9th consecutive season in the OTP Bank Liga and 62nd year in existence as a football club.

First team squad

Transfers

Summer

In:

Out:

List of Hungarian football transfers summer 2014

Statistics

Appearances and goals
Last updated on 30 November 2014.

|-
|colspan="14"|Youth players:

|-
|colspan="14"|Players no longer at the club:
|}

Top scorers
Includes all competitive matches. The list is sorted by shirt number when total goals are equal.

Last updated on 30 November 2014

Disciplinary record
Includes all competitive matches. Players with 1 card or more included only.

Last updated on 30 November 2014

Overall
{|class="wikitable"
|-
|Games played || 23 (16 OTP Bank Liga, 1 Hungarian Cup and 6 Hungarian League Cup)
|-
|Games won || 9 (7 OTP Bank Liga, 0 Hungarian Cup and 2 Hungarian League Cup)
|-
|Games drawn || 9 (6 OTP Bank Liga, 0 Hungarian Cup and 3 Hungarian League Cup)
|-
|Games lost || 5 (3 OTP Bank Liga, 1 Hungarian Cup and 1 Hungarian League Cup)
|-
|Goals scored || 39
|-
|Goals conceded || 25
|-
|Goal difference || +14
|-
|Yellow cards || 44
|-
|Red cards || 2
|-
|rowspan="1"|Worst discipline ||  Tamás Kecskés (8 , 0 )
|-
|rowspan="3"|Best result || 3–0 (A) v Nyíregyháza - OTP Bank Liga - 02-08-2014
|-
| 3–0 (H) v MTK - OTP Bank Liga - 19-08-2014
|-
| 3–0 (H) v Pápa - OTP Bank Liga - 08-11-2014
|-
|rowspan="1"|Worst result || 0–2 (A) v Videoton - OTP Bank Liga - 25-10-2014
|-
|rowspan="1"|Most appearances ||  László Bartha (19 appearances)
|-
|rowspan="1"|Top scorer ||  László Bartha (7 goals)
|-
|Points || 36/69 (52.17%)
|-

Nemzeti Bajnokság I

Matches

Classification

Results summary

Results by round

Hungarian Cup

League Cup

Knockout phase

References

External links
 Eufo
 Official Website
 UEFA
 fixtures and results

Paksi SE seasons
Hungarian football clubs 2014–15 season